Joint Anti-Fascist Refugee Committee (JAFRC) was a nonprofit organization to provide humanitarian aid to refugees of the Spanish Civil War.

History

In 1941, the Joint Anti-Fascist Refugee Committee was formed by Lincoln Battalion veterans of the Spanish Civil War to provide aid to Spanish Loyalists refugees from Francoist Spain.  JAFRC superseded previous groups, including the North American Committee to Aid Spanish Democracy and American Medical Bureau (the latter of which Barsky had founded in 1936).  Specifically, JAFRC was "dedicated to the rescue and relief of thousands of anti-fascist fighters trapped in Vichy, France, and North Africa" so that they might "return to the active fight against the Axis."

JAFRC established a fundraising organization called "Spanish Refugee Appeal" of the Joint Anti-Fascist Refugee Committee."  Dorothy Parker took charge of the committee's fundraising and the anti-fascists soon attracted the support of Leonard Bernstein, Albert Einstein, Lillian Hellman, Langston Hughes, and Orson Welles.

In 1942, it was licensed to do so in Vichy France by President Franklin Roosevelt's wartime administration, and the anti-fascists were then granted tax-exempt status.

In 1946, the JAFRC began to face nearly-constant attack from federal government organizations. In 1948, the Bureau of Internal Revenue (now the Internal Revenue Service) rescinded JAFRC's tax-exempt status.  Thereafter, the Subversive Activities Control Board (SACB) tried to force JAFRC to register as a communist front organization.

In April 1951, Allan Rosenberg successfully argued for the complainant Joint Anti-Fascist Refugee Committee in Anti-Fascist Committee v. McGrath before the US Supreme Court.

In 1955, the JAFRC board voted to disband.

People

Leaders

According to letterhead dated March 17, 1944, leaders included:

 Walter Rautenstrauch, National Honorary Chairman
 Edward K. Barsky, National Chairman
 Lyman R. Bradley, National Treasurer
 Helen R. Bryan, National Secretary

National Sponsors included:
 Dr. Comfort A. Adams
 Rabbi Michael Aper
 Dr. Hery Lambert Bibby
 James L. Brewer
 Dr. Walter B. Cannon
 Prof. Richard T. Cox
 Martha Dodd
 Julien Duvivier
 Dr. Frederick May Eliot
 Dr. Henry Pratt Fairchild
 Lion Feuchtwanger
 Prof. Irving Fisher
 Prof. Mitchell Franklin
 Rev. Stephen H. Fritchman
 Prof. Marion Hathaway
 Kenneth Leslie
 Princess Helga zu Loewenstein
 Dr. Robert Morss Lovett
 Prof. Kirtley F. Mather
 Philip Merivale
 Rt. Rev. Edward L. Parsons
 Prof. Renato Poggioli
 Dr. Francis M. Pottenger
 Paul Robeson
 Prof. Harlow Shapley
 Dalton Trumbo
 Dame May Whitty
 Dr. Max Yergan

Members

 Moses Fishman
 Mark Straus MD
 Arthur Szyk (alleged)

Spanish Refugee Appeal supporters

Appeal Officers:
 Pablo Picasso, Honorary Chair
 Dorothy Parker, Chairman

National Sponsors included:

 Rev. Dr. Charles B. Ackley
 Lemuel Ayers
 Aline Bernstein
 Leonard Bernstein
 Alvah Bessie
 Lyman R. Bradley
 Dorothy Brewster
 Arthur G. Brodeur
 Henrietta Buckmaster
 Rabbi Elliott Burstein
 Allan Chase
 Edward Chodorov
 John M. Coffee
 Rabbi J. X. Coeh
 Charles A. Collins
 Eugene P. Connolly
 Kyle Crichton
 Bartley C. Crum
 Bernard Davidoff
 Agnes George De Mille
 Mrs. George Adams Dewey
 Earl B. Dickerson
 Dean Dixon
 Martha Dodd
 Olin Downes
 Muriel Draper
 Albert Einstein
 Rabbi Mitchel S. Eskolsky
 Philip Evergood
 Henry Pratt Fairchild
 L.S. Fanning
 Howard Fast
 Lion Feuchtwanger
 Louis Finger
 Elizabeth P. Frazier
 Rve. Stephen Fritchman
 Betty Garrett
 Frank Gervasi
 Elinor S. Gimbel
 Rabbi Solomon Goldman
 Robert Gordis
 William Gropper
 Chaim Gross
 Ralph H. Grundlach
 Richard Gump
 Ralph Gundlach
 Marion Hathaway
 Rita Hayworth
 Lillian Hellman 
 Libby Holman
 Langston Hughes
 Walter Huston
 Stanley M. Isaacs
 Mrs. Sydney Joseph
 Barney Josephson
 Rober W. Kenny
 Rockwell Kent
 Fiske Kimball
 Arthur Kober
 Alfred Kreymborg
 Canada Lee
 M.V. Leof
 Kenneth Leslie
 Ray Lev
 Walter H. Leibman
 Daniel A. Longbaker
 Louis Lozowick
 Florence J. Luscomb
 Richard Lyndon
 Louis F. McCabe
 John T. McManus
 Rev. Dr. John D. Mackay
 Manuel Magana
 Albert Maltz
 Alfred T. Manacher
 Richard Maney
 Heinrich Mann
 Thomas Mann
 Alicia Markova
 George Marshall
 Kirtley F. Mather
 F.O. Matthiesen
 Rev. William Howard Melesh
 Yehudi Menuhin
 Saul Mills
 James K. Moffitt
 Pierre Monteux
 Karen Morley
 William Morris Jr.
 Zero Mostel
 Jarmila Novotná
 Michael J. Obermeier
 Harvey O'Connor
 Eugene O'Neill
 Isabel de Palencia
 Aubrey Pankey
 Beryl Parker
 Edward L. Parsons
 J. Gilbert Peirce
 Gerry Pelles
 Gregor Piatigorsky
 David de Sola Pool
 Adam Clayton Powell, Jr.
 Walter Rautenstrauch
 Anton Refregier
 John Reiner
 Quentin Reynolds
 Paul Robeson
 William M. Rubin
 Mrs. Maurice Bower Saul
 Jimmy Savo
 Geoges Schreiber
 Hazel Scott
 Anna Seghers
 Lisa Sergio
 Harlow Shapley
 Sol Silverman
 Hilda Simms
 Edgar Snow
 Moses Soyer
 Johannes Steel
 Vilhjalmur Stefansson
 Mark Straus
 Jack Strauss
 Arthur Szyk
 Genevieve Tabouis
 Dalton Trumbo
 M.S. Vidaver
 Harry F. Ward
 Morris Watson
 Margaret Webster
 Orson Welles
 Mrs. Philip E. Wilcox
 Mitchell Wilson
 Carl Zigrosser
 Leane Zugsmith

See also

 Joint Anti-Fascist Refugee Committee v. McGrath
 North American Committee to Aid Spanish Democracy 
 American Medical Bureau 
 Lincoln Battalion

References

External sources

 Yale University Archives
 Digital Commonwealth

Legal organizations based in the United States
Organizations established in 1941
Progressivism in the United States
Political organizations based in the United States
1941 establishments in the United States
Organizations disestablished in 1955
Humanitarian aid organizations
Organisations of the Spanish Civil War
Spain–United States relations
Anti-fascist organizations in the United States